Manhattan Regional Airport  in Riley County, Kansas, United States, is the second-busiest commercial airport in Kansas. It is owned by the city of Manhattan, Kansas, and is about five miles southwest of downtown Manhattan. American Airlines serves the airport with five daily flights to Chicago O'Hare International Airport and Dallas/Fort Worth International Airport. The airport is also used for general aviation and for planes chartered by the military and college sports teams (the airport is four miles east of Fort Riley and eight miles southwest of Kansas State University's athletic complex).

The National Plan of Integrated Airport Systems for 2013–2017 categorized it as a primary commercial service airport (more than 10,000 enplanements per year).

Traffic at the airport multiplied after American Eagle began its service in August 2009. Between 2008 and 2012, Federal Aviation Administration records show that annual passenger boardings (enplanements) at the airport grew from 16,489 to more than 69,000.  The most recent statistics show 70,705 enplanements in 2018.

History
On June 13, 1939, construction began with the planting of temporary grass runways. The facility was dedicated in November 1940. The first "Manhattan Municipal Airport" terminal was dedicated on April 19, 1953, with U.S. Senator Frank Carlson giving a speech. Continental Airlines DC-3 flights began that month.

Since the 1950s a number of airlines have served Manhattan Regional Airport.

In 1979, the southwest end of runway 3-21 was extended 1,500 ft. and the entire runway was widened 50 ft., which allowed new Boeing 737 service operated by Frontier Airlines. The original runway has 13 inches of concrete from 1963 with additional concrete from 1979 at the southwest end and widened areas. Only a 660 ft area for runway safety area is built at the departure end of runway 21 due to the location of a localizer antenna compared to the compliant 1000 ft area at the end of runway 3. Therefore, runway 21 has a landing length of 7,000 versus 6660 ft on takeoffs and landings from runway 3.

The current airline terminal opened in two phases between 2015 and 2016, replacing the 1997 terminal. The $18 million project has three jet bridge parking positions from two gates, and can accommodate aircraft as large as the Boeing 737 or Airbus A320. The new terminal has more space for ticketing, baggage claim, car rental, and security screening. There is space for a restaurant, but as of August 2017 a tenant has not been found.

Historical airline service
Continental Airlines
The first scheduled airline at Manhattan was Continental Airlines, which began Douglas DC-3 flights in April 1953. Manhattan was added as a stop on a route between Denver and Kansas City, a route that made a total of ten stops at smaller cities throughout Colorado and Kansas.  Continental pulled out in 1961, replaced by Central Airlines.

Central Airlines
Central Airlines provided service from 1961 through 1967 by picking up the former Continental Airlines route between Denver and Kansas City with stops at Manhattan and several other points. Central also used DC-3 aircraft.

Capitol Air Service
Capitol Air Service (ICAO airline designator CPX), was headquartered in Manhattan from the 1960s until the company ceased flights in 1989, after having twice been grounded by the FAA for multiple safety and records keeping violations.  Capitol Air provided point-to-point air service to cities throughout northeastern Kansas.

In the 1970s Capital Air, an air taxi service, suffered two crashes, one with fatalities. In the 1980s one of its aircraft was tipped over by a gust of wind while waiting for take off clearance, and another aircraft, a Twin Otter, clipped the side of a terminal building, both incidents occurring at Kansas City International Airport.

At its height Capitol Air served Manhattan; Salina, KS (SLN); Topeka, KS (FOE); Lawrence, KS (LWC); and Kansas City, MO (MCI) using two 20-passenger de Havilland Canada Twin Otters and smaller Cessna 402 aircraft. From mid-1987 until early 1989 Capitol Air operated as Braniff Express on behalf of Braniff Airways.

Frontier Airlines
Starting when it merged with Central Airlines in 1967, the original Frontier Airlines flew from Manhattan to Salina, Wichita (ICT), and Denver (DEN) westbound and to Topeka (FOE) and Kansas City eastbound on 44-seat Convair CV580s. Beginning in late 1979 Frontier replaced their Convair propeller aircraft with Boeing 737 jets on the same routings. Direct service to Chicago O'Hare International Airport with a stop at Lincoln was also added with the 737s. All Frontier service ended in 1983 being replaced by Air Midwest.

Trans Central Airlines
Trans Central briefly operated from Manhattan to Oklahoma City and Dallas/Ft. Worth in 1982 using Fairchild Swearingen Metroliner commuter aircraft.

Air Midwest
Beginning in 1982, Wichita-based Air Midwest flew from Manhattan to Kansas City and Salina on 17-passenger Swearingen Metroliner IIs. From 1986 through 1988 Air Midwest was an Eastern Air Lines affiliate, operating as Eastern Express and flew 30-passenger Saab 340As in the Eastern paint scheme to Kansas City. When Eastern closed its hub at Kansas City in late 1988, Air Midwest signed a new codeshare agreement with the second incarnation of Braniff Airlines, which had started a small hub at MCI, and began flights as Braniff Express'to Kansas City on Swearingen Metroliner IIs. This was in addition to Capitol Air's service to Kansas City also operating as Braniff Express. Braniff filed bankruptcy and shut down in late 1989 and Air Midwest reverted to operating under their own branding to Kansas City. Air Midwest was also operating a codeshare agreement with TWA as Trans World Express at the major carriers' St. Louis hub. For a short time in 1990 nonstop TWExpress flights were operated from Manhattan to St. Louis using Embraer EMB 120 Brasilia aircraft.

Mesa Air Group

In 1991 Air Midwest was sold to the Mesa Air Group of Nevada.  Subsequently, Air Midwest (a Mesa Air Group subsidiary), acting under a codeshare agreement with US Airways and operating as US Airways Express, served Kansas City, Missouri from Manhattan, Kansas with three daily flights using 19-passenger Beechcraft 1900D turboprop aircraft. The service ended in 2008 when Mesa Air Group shut down the Air Midwest division and all Essential Air Service contracts and flights operated by Mesa were closed.

Great Lakes Airlines
Great Lakes Airlines flew to Manhattan between March 30, 2008, and April 7, 2010, taking over after Mesa left and ending service after American Eagle announced additional expansion. There were three daily flights, most days to Kansas City, and initially two daily flights (with one stop) to Denver. The flights to Denver were later cut back to once daily. Great Lakes used Beech 1900Ds.

Allegiant Air
Allegiant Air operated a short-lived service of twice-weekly flights between Manhattan and Phoenix–Mesa Gateway Airport from November 7, 2013, to February 23, 2014.

American Eagle
American Eagle began service on August 26, 2009, with two daily nonstop flights to the Dallas/Fort Worth International Airport (DFW). In 2010 new service to Chicago O'Hare International Airport (ORD) was added as well as a third flight to DFW. Flights to DFW are operated by Skywest Airlines with Bombardier CRJ700 series aircraft and by Envoy Air with Embraer ERJ-145s and Embraer ERJ-175s. Flights to ORD are on Envoy Air ERJ-140s. Flights to ORD were discontinued in April 2020 but returned in May 2021.

Facilities
Manhattan Regional Airport covers 680 acres (275 ha) at an elevation of 1,066 feet (325 m).

In 2017 the airport had 24,260 aircraft operations: 81% general aviation, 4% airline, 9% air taxi and 6% military. 42 aircraft were then based at this airport: 33 single-engine, 7 multi-engine and 2 jet.

The airport has two concrete runways: 3/21 is 7,000 by 150 feet (2,134 x 46 m) and 13/31 is 5,000 by 75 feet (1,524 x 23 m). There are five taxiways and two parking aprons; they can support aircraft as large as the Boeing 767 or C-17 but city ordinance requires aircraft with a landing weight of greater than 110,000 contact the airport director prior to landing or they will be in violation of the city ordinance.

Three navigation systems and multiple lighting systems guide aircraft; an FAA control tower and two Aircraft Rescue and Fire-Fighting (ARFF) vehicles round out the airside support. Any aircraft with 30 passenger seats or more, or over  landing weight requires prior permission from the Airport Director to land. Aircraft as large as the Boeing 767 land occasionally as charters for the military or sports teams.

Services
The first phase of the airport's new  terminal facility opened in March 2015, housing American Airlines, Hertz Rent-a-Car, Enterprise Car Rental, and other services.  The expanded facility includes two gates, an expanded TSA security checkpoint, and additional passenger circulation space. There are also accommodations for a future airport restaurant. The terminal replaces a  terminal opened in 1997, which was demolished and replaced due to increased commercial airline traffic. The terminal is located at 5500 Skyway Drive, adjacent to the FAA control tower and FBO.

The FBO facility, next to the passenger terminal, is occupied by Kansas Air Center, which has been operating at the Manhattan airport since May 1989. It is a full service FBO, providing fuel, charter service, flight instruction, aircraft rental and management services.

An older  terminal building built in 1958 is now home to the airport administrative offices.

Heartland Aviation uses an  stone maintenance hangar, constructed in 1940, next to the old terminal building for servicing and repairing aircraft. The Kansas State University Flying Club, an airport tenant for over 50 years, has office space in this facility for instruction and flight planning.

Other facilities include a fire station, 48 hangars, storage areas, a fuel farm, and an air traffic control tower.

The airport has three parking lots adjacent to the passenger terminal. Paid parking began in February 2021, replacing free parking.

Airline and destinations

Statistics

Accidents and incidents
  On May 28, 1963, a Lockheed L-1049 Super Constellation operated by Standard Airways suffered a failed propeller and crash landed at the Manhattan airport. All 70 passengers and crew survived, but the aircraft was written off.

References

Other sources

 Reuters/American Airlines press release
 Essential Air Service documents (Docket DOT-OST-2003-15483) from the U.S. Department of Transportation:
 Order 2004-2-14 (February 17, 2004): selects Air Midwest, Inc., a wholly owned subsidiary of Mesa Air Group, Inc., d/b/a US Airways Express, to provide subsidized essential air service (EAS) for a two-year period at Manhattan and Salina, Kansas, at a combined annual subsidy rate of $721,605.
 Order 2006-3-15 (March 15, 2006): re-selecting Air Midwest, Inc., a wholly owned subsidiary of Mesa Air Group, Inc., d/b/a US Airways Express, to provide subsidized essential air service (EAS) for the two-year period beginning March 1, 2006, at Manhattan and Salina, Kansas, at a combined annual subsidy rate of $974,008.
 Order 2007-12-25 (December 21, 2007): re-selecting Air Midwest, Inc., a wholly owned subsidiary of Mesa Air Group, Inc., d/b/a US Airways Express to provide subsidized essential air service (EAS) at Manhattan and Salina, Kansas, for a total annual subsidy of $1,619,566 for the two-year period beginning March 1, 2008.
 Order 2008-2-5 (February 1, 2008): prohibiting Air Midwest, Inc. a wholly owned subsidiary of Mesa Air Group, Inc., d/b/a US Airways Express from suspending its subsidized essential air services at Manhattan and Salina, Kansas, until Great Lakes Aviation, Ltd. begins full replacement service, and selecting Great Lakes to provide those services for a new two-year period at an annual subsidy rate of $1,997,237.
 Order 2009-11-25 (November 30, 2009): requesting proposals from carriers interested in providing essential air service (EAS) at Salina, Kansas, for the two-year period beginning April 1, 2010, with or without subsidy. With respect to this order, we are soliciting proposals for service to Salina only. In the past, the communities of Salina and Manhattan were handled under the same contract because the flights were historically routed Salina-Manhattan-Kansas City. However, on or about August 26, 2009, American Eagle inaugurated subsidy-free regional jet service from Dallas-Fort Worth to Manhattan. American Eagle provides two daily nonstop round trips in the Manhattan-Dallas-Fort Worth market with 50-seat Embraer ERJ-145 regional jets on a subsidy-free basis. That level of service fully meets Manhattan's EAS requirements, so, consistent with longstanding program practice, we will simply rely on American Eagle's subsidy-free service and not request proposals. Despite not receiving an EAS subsidy, Manhattan will remain in the EAS program, and, should American Eagle subsequently decide to file a notice to leave, the department would initiate a carrier-replacement proceeding by issuing an order holding in American Eagle and requesting proposals for replacement service from all interested carriers.

External links

 Manhattan Regional Airport (MHK), official site
 Manhattan Regional Airport at GlobalSecurity.org
  from Kansas DOT Airport Directory
 Aerial image as of October 1991 from USGS The National Map
 
 

Airports in Kansas
Airports established in 1940
Buildings and structures in Riley County, Kansas
Former Essential Air Service airports
Manhattan, Kansas